Joseph Hill (born 18 October 1976) is a New Zealand cricketer. He played in eight first-class and four List A matches for Central Districts from 1999 to 2001.

See also
 List of Central Districts representative cricketers

References

External links
 

1976 births
Living people
New Zealand cricketers
Central Districts cricketers
Cricketers from Blenheim, New Zealand